Tour de Berne is an elite professional road bicycle racing event held in Berne, Switzerland with races for men and women.

Men's event 
The men's event began in 1920 and has previously been a UCI 1.2 rated event on the UCI Europe Tour.

Women's event 

The women's Tour de Berne is an elite professional event and since 2005 has been elevated to the UCI Women's Road Cycling World Cup.  The race is six laps of a  city circuit for  total distance.

Past winners

References

External links

Sport in Bern
Cycle races in Switzerland
Women's road bicycle races
UCI Women's Road World Cup
UCI Europe Tour races
Recurring sporting events established in 1921
1921 establishments in Switzerland
Recurring sporting events established in 2001
2001 establishments in Switzerland

fr:Tour de Berne féminin